Verdella is an unincorporated community in Barton County, in the U.S. state of Missouri.

History
A post office called Verdella was established in 1880, and remained in operation until 1907. The origin of the name Verdella is uncertain.

References

Unincorporated communities in Barton County, Missouri
Unincorporated communities in Missouri